Moshe Schneersohn (also, Moshe Zalmonovitch or Moshe Shneuri, later Leon Yulievitz) (born c. 1784 - died before 1853) was the youngest son of the founder of Chabad-Lubavitch Hasidism, Rabbi Shneur Zalman of Liadi. According to some scholars he converted to Christianity and died in a St. Petersburg asylum. Chabad sources claim that his conversion and related documents were faked by the Church.

Life

The year of Moshe Schneersohn's birth is not clear. It is known that he married in 1797, and since all of his brothers married at 14 years of age, scholars assume that he was born around 1784. The sixth Lubavitcher Rebbe in his historical notes on the Chabad movement notes that he was born in 1784 in Liozna, but elsewhere writes that he was born in 1779.

It is alleged that when he was eight years old he started showing signs of mental infirmity. He received medical treatment, and from the scant information available, it appears that his illness alternated between remission and outbreak during his childhood. In 1801 his father took him for treatment with doctors in Vitebsk, St. Petersburg and Smolensk.

He married Shifra daughter of Rabbi Tzvi Hirsh of Ule, a town near Liadi. He went to live with his father-in-law in Ule and was soon appointed to the post of Rabbi in that town.

Moshe had an excellent memory, and while in Ule he authored a number of manuscripts of novellas that he had heard from his father (as well as notations). These are still used by Chabad Hasidim today.

During Napoleon's invasion of Russia in 1812, his family fled from Liadi to the Russian interior. His father died as a result of the journey. Moshe did not go with them, instead traveling to Shklov. He was captured by the French Army and sentenced to death for espionage, but he was pardoned. According to a letter written by his mother in 1817, he had been stable prior to this incident, but apparently this event took a toll on his mental health.

Alleged conversion

Chabad accounts and scholarly accounts of Moshe's conversion and later life differ.

All scholarly articles have to say is this: After the alleged conversion he changed his name to Leon Yulievitch. He returned to visit Lubavitch, but fled, ultimately dying in a mental institution in St. Petersburg.

His conversion and mental infirmity and apostasy have been denied by the Chabad movement consistently since his death. 

The Chabad biography, authored by the sixth Rebbe, Rabbi Yosef Yitzchok Schneersohn, recounts that Moshe accompanied his brother, the second Rebbe of Chabad, Dovber Schneuri on between Moshe and his Chief Priest. Moshe reluctantly accepted the challenge, and won the debate. Furious, the Christians arrested Moshe, took him to a church and physically forced him to sign his name to a letter that declared his intent to convert to Christianity. Moshe managed to escape from the church, but due to fear of rearrest, he traveled around Europe incognito until his death in 1878. The documentation of his conversion post date this incident by several years.

Contemporary Chabad sources repeat the story of the attempted forced conversion.

Another account says:
"What happened was that the Governor presented various nobles to the Czar first, and only then did he present the sons of the Alter Rebbe. Rabbi Moshe took his grievance directly to the Governor, aided by his fluency in a number of languages.
The Archbishop of Smolensk happened to be present at the time and, considering his behaviour to be effrontery, lashed out both at Rabbi Moshe and the Torah. Rabbi Moshe made a stinging retort and there ensued a heated debate on religion, culminating in the decision to arrange a disputation-to be held in MarCheshvan 5576/1815.
The disputation took place in the church of Yartsava, near Smolensk, in the presence of the bishops of Smolensk and Niezhin, and lasted an entire month. Rabbi Moshe emerged triumphant. Chagrined at their defeat, the ecclesiastical authorities decided to confine him in one of the churches in Kiev or Vladimir, in the interior of Russia.
On the fourth day, he was already en route to Vladimir, escorted by two clergymen and a detachment of armed soldiers. As they spent the night in the vicinity of Moscow, a deep sleep fell upon the party. Seeing his chance, Rabbi Moshe took flight.
G-d gave him strength he did not normally possess and, impervious to the cold and the massive snowdrifts, Rabbi Moshe forged on until he came to Aryal. There he took refuge with Rabbi Moshe Leib Jacobson, who hid him in his house for several days. Then he set out for Wolhinia.
Rabbi Moshe's escape took place on the night of the 19th of Kislev, 5576/1815 [exactly 27 years after his father's miraculous liberation]. Some time later his family left for Eretz Yisrael (Israel) and he went into exile from 5576/1815 to Sivan 5638/1878."
Rabbi Moshe passed away [at age 94] in Radomislya, near Kiev, in 5638/1878, and is buried there."

References

Bibliography
 Neehaz ba-Svakh: Pirkei Mashber u-Mevucha be-Toldot ha-Hasidut, David Assaf, Zalman Shazar Institute, Jerusalem 2006
 
 Days in Chabad,  Yosef Y. Kaminetzky

Chabad-Lubavitch Hasidim
Russian Hasidim
Shneur Zalman of Liadi
Chabad-Lubavitch related controversies

1780s births
19th-century deaths
Year of birth uncertain
Year of death unknown